Blake Thomas Shepard  is an American voice actor who works on anime series at ADV Films, Funimation and Sentai Filmworks. He has provided voices for a number of English-language versions of Japanese anime series and films; notable credits include Ikki from Amnesia, Yuzuru Otonashi from Angel Beats!, Soma Yukihira from Food Wars!: Shokugeki no Soma, Arata Wataya from Chihayafuru, Tanaka from Tanaka-kun is Always Listless, Birthday from Hamatora, Agito Wanijima from Air Gear, Godo Kusanagi from Campione!, Taro Sado from MM!, Kei Takishima from S · A: Special A, Kyosuke Natsume from the Little Busters! series, Futoshi from Darling in the Franxx, Akiyuki Takehara from Xam'd: Lost Memories, and Hiro Hiyorimi from Princess Resurrection. Outside of voice acting, Shepard is the lead singer and guitarist in a band called Electric Attitude.

Career
In 2017, Shepard voiced Arata Wataya, who is Chihaya's childhood friend that inspired her to play competitive karuta in Sentai Filmworks' English dub of the Chihayafuru anime series. The first season of the series was released on home video in September 2017.

Dubbing roles

Anime

References

External links
 
 
 
 Blake Shepard at the CrystalAcids Anime Voice Actor Database

1984 births
Living people
American animators
American male voice actors
People from Houston